The Fiat 124 is a small family car manufactured and marketed by Italian company Fiat between 1966 and 1974. The saloon superseded the Fiat 1300 and was the basis for several variants including a station wagon, a four-seater coupé (124 Sport Coupé), a two-seater convertible (124 Sport Spider) and a lengthened and more luxurious version, the 125, launched in early 1967.

The Russian-built VAZ-2101 "Zhiguli" and its many derivatives (known universally as the Lada outside the Soviet Union) were based on the Fiat 124, and are the best known of the many licensed variants of the 124 manufactured around the world.  The Lada constitutes the vast majority of 124 production, and makes it the fifth best selling automotive platform in history.

The 124 was superseded in its home market by the Fiat 131.

History
Following its introduction in 1966 with a publicity stunt, with Fiat filming the dropping of the car by parachute from a plane, the 124 won the 1967 European Car of the Year.
As a clean-sheet design by Oscar Montabone, the chief engineer responsible for its development, the 124 used only the all-synchromesh gear box from the Fiat 1500. The 124 featured a spacious interior, advanced coil spring rear suspension, disc brakes on all wheels and lightweight construction.

A 5-door station wagon variant (named 124 Familiare on its home market) as well as the 124 Sport Spider variants debuted at the 48th Turin Motor show in November 1966. A few months later, at the March 1967 Geneva Motor Show, the 124 Sport Coupé completed the range. The two Sport models were powered by an all-new 1.4-litre dual overhead camshaft engine producing  at 6,500 rpm.

The 124 Special
In October 1968 Fiat launched the 124 Special; like Fiat's other Special models, it was an upmarket, better appointed and higher performance variant of the standard saloon. A month after, in November, it was displayed at the 50th Turin Motor Show alongside its larger sibling, the new 125 Special.
In addition to a 1.4-litre overhead valve engine, the 124 Special notably introduced all-new 5-link (four longitudinal, one transverse) solid axle rear suspension in place of the original 3-link design. Starting from late 1968 the same improved rear axle was adopted by both Sport models.

In detail the Special's 1,438 cc type 124 A2 engine had the same bore and stroke of the Sport Coupé and Sport Spider engines (80 × 71.5 mm), but eschewed the dual overhead camshafts of the two sportscars in favour of the more conventional overhead valve setup from the 124 saloon. Besides engine and rear axle, notable mechanical changes from the regular 124 were an alternator replacing the dynamo, an uprated clutch, standard 155R13 Pirelli Cinturato radial tyres, and the addition of a vacuum servo to the all-disc braking system.

Visually the Special could be immediately distinguished from the standard model by its new, rectangular grille with four inset round headlamps. Less evident differences were larger vertical bumper over-riders, wheels with round ventilation holes as on the Sport models, new flush door handles, different tail lamps with integrated reflectors, and a central back-up light. The interior featured a redesigned padded dashboard with an oval binnacle housing two round instruments and a car radio console, a steering wheel without horn ring, new door cards, and more supportive seats.

1970 revisions and the 124 Special T

At the November 1970 Turin Motor Show Fiat introduced a round of updates for the entire saloon and wagon 124 range, as well as a new model variant—the 124 Special T.

All models had gained air outlets added to the C-pillar for better ventilation, and a split brake circuit; while some features previously exclusive to the 124 Special such as servo-assisted brakes, back-up light and an alternator were made standard across the range. Berlina and Familiare both had a new grille with alternated chrome and black horizontal bars, and larger bumper over-riders. Additionally the Berlina had large, nearly square tail lamps made up by two stacked rectangular elements.

The renewed Special sported a completely redesigned front end. A black, square-mesh radiator grille was crossed by a horizontal bright bar joining the dual headlamps; each of the four round lamps was set in its own square, bright-edged housing. The grille-headlamps assembly was flanked by the turn indicators. Front and rear the bumpers had lost their over-riders, replaced by full-width rubber strips. At the rear the lamps were also new—still horizontal and rectangular in shape unlike the ones used on the standard saloon—and the whole tail panel was surrounded by a chromed profile.
Inside there was a new dashboard with imitation wood inserts, carpets instead of rubber mats, and cloth upholstery.
The "T" in 124 Special T stood for twin cam, hinting at the car's 1,438 cc dual overhead camshaft engine, derived from the Sport Coupé and Spider but in a milder state of tune. Externally the Special T was identical to the Special, save for model badging at the rear.

Engines
Power came from a 1.2 L (1,197 cc) Fiat OHV inline-four engine. Also, there were the 124 Special with a 1,438 cc OHV engine and the 124 Special T with 1,438 cc and 1,592 cc twin cam OHC engines. The twin cams are connected to a four-speed and five-speed gearbox.

1200 (1,197 cc) –  –  (1966–1974)
1400 (1,438 cc) –  –  (1968–1974)
1400 Special T (1,438 cc) Twin cam –  (1968–1972)
1600 Special T (1,592 cc) Twin cam –  (1973–1974)
Abarth Rally (1,756 cc) Twin cam –  (1972–1973)
2000 (1,920 cc)  Twin cam –  (1979)

Foreign production
Throughout the 1960s and 1970s, Fiat sought to extend its worldwide reach by entering into various collaborative agreements with smaller manufacturers (mostly in developing nations) by licensing the 124 design following its discontinuation in mainstream Western European markets.  The best known (and most produced) of all the 124 derivates is the Russian-built Lada, which has to date, sold over 15 million units.

Soviet Union/Russia

In 1966, Fiat entered into a collaborative agreement with the Soviet government to establish car manufacture in the Samara region of Russia. Fiat was contracted to take part in the creation of the massive VAZ plant in the newly created town of Togliatti, named after the Italian communist leader of the same name. The factory produced an adapted version 124R of the 124, known as the VAZ-2101 "Zhiguli" (sold as the Lada 1200/1300 in export markets), until 1982, and 1200s until 1987. Based on the 124, they were modified at more than 800 points, the major modifications having an entirely different OHC engine, hydraulic clutch, drum brakes at the rear, modified suspensions, etc. Early modifications include the VAZ-2102 (station wagon), 2103 (Lada 1500), 2106 (Lada 1600) and 21011 (Lada 1300). The updated and restyled versions of the 124-based design were produced until September 2012, as the VAZ-2104, 2105 and 2107 – marketed as the Lada Riva in UK markets. Production of this line reached 17,332,954 cars, this being the second largest production volume for a car in automotive history.

India

The Fiat 124 was also introduced in India by Premier Automobiles Limited. In 1981 Premier began the process of acquiring the production tooling for the facelifted SEAT 124 D after authorisation from Fiat. The model was released in the autumn of 1985 as the Premier 118NE. The car was very similar to the 1966 version except for a few cosmetic changes to the front and rear. However, Premier incorporated the Nissan A12 (1,171 cc and 52 bhp) powertrain instead of the original Fiat engine along with a Nissan manual gearbox. Added in 1996, there was also a version called the 1.38D which sported a diesel engine, built under license from Fratelli Negri Macchine Diesel Sud of Italy.

Near the end of production an improved model called Viceroy was released in collaboration with Peugeot. Production ended in 2001.

Malaysia
The 124 was also built at the Kilang Pembena Kereta-Kereta (KPKK) factory in Tampoi, Johor, since the latter half of 1967. The cars were distributed by Sharikat Fiat Distributors. In late 1971, about a year after its introduction in Italy, the twin-cam 124 Special T also joined the Malaysian production line.

Spain

In the frame of the licence agreement between SEAT and Fiat, it was produced and sold in Spain with the name SEAT 124 from 1968 to 1975. Also a clone from the 124 Special with some elements from Fiat 125 was produced from 1969 to 1975 with the 1438 cc engine along with the twin-cams known as the "FUs" 1,600 cc (1970–72), and 1,800 cc (1972–75) branded as SEAT 1430. In 1975 when Fiat stopped production of the Fiat 124, the SEAT 124 had a minor facelift done by Giorgetto Giugiaro changing the aesthetics of the car by changing the round headlamps to rectangular design and integrating taillights into the body, car was known as the SEAT 124D and remained in production until 1980 with the Sport versions now codenamed the "FLs", FL-40/45 1,600 cc 90HP, FL-80/82 1,800 cc 114HP and FL-90 1,919 cc 114HP
The car was very successful in Spain, and was sold in both the four-door and station wagon versions.

Bulgaria
The Fiat 124 was also produced under the name Pirin-Fiat in Lovech, Bulgaria, on the basis of complete knockdown (CKD) kits between 1967 and 1971.

Turkey

The Fiat 124 was also produced by Tofaş under the names "Murat 124" between 1971-1977 and "Serçe" ("sparrow" in Turkish) between 1984 and 1994, in Bursa, Turkey. 134,867 Murat 124s were produced between 1971 and 1994. Tofaş concurrently produced the Fiat 131 series under the name Murat 131 between 1976 and 2002. Today, the company manufactures bona fide Fiat models.

Korea
The Fiat 124 was also produced under the name Fiat-KIA 124 by Asia Motors in South Korea, between 1970 and 1975. In total 6775 units were assembled.

Egypt
From 2002 to 2007, Lada-Egypt company built at least 9,000 cars (2,200 in 2006) in the shell of VAZ-2107 (Riva), and it continues in 2012.

124 Cabriolet
At Salone dell'Automobile of Torino in 1966, Carrozzeria Touring presented a convertible version of Fiat 124 saloon. It was the last car built by Touring. Only one example was made. Reactions were positive, but the Fiat CEO terminated this project in favour of the Pininfarina-styled 124 Sport Spider.

References

Notes

Bibliography

Further reading

External links

Italian site dedicated to the Fiat 124 (English pages)
Italian forum dedicated to the Fiat 124 

124
Mid-size cars
Sedans
Station wagons
1970s cars
Cars introduced in 1966
Rally cars
Rear-wheel-drive vehicles
Cars powered by longitudinal 4-cylinder engines
Cars of Turkey
Cars of India